Coromandel was the French prize Modeste, captured in 1793 and refitted at Chittagong, British India (now Bangladesh). She made two voyages transporting convicts to Port Jackson, the first for the British East India Company (EIC). A French privateer captured her in 1805 but she had returned to British hands before 1809. An American privateer captured her in 1814 but this time the British Royal Navy recaptured her within days. She foundered in Indian waters on 6 February 1821.

Career
Coromandel first appeared in Lloyd's Register (LR) in 1800 with A. Sterling, master, Reeve & Co., owners, and trade London–Cape of Good Hope (CGH).

Convict transport
On her first voyage transporting convicts, under the command of Alex Sterling (or Stirling), she sailed from Portsmouth, England on 8 February 1802, and Spithead, on 12 February, in company with,  and arrived at Port Jackson on 13 June 1802. Coromandel transported 138 male convicts, one of whom died on the voyage.

Coromandel left Port Jackson on 22 July bound for China. On the way she sighted the islands of Nama, Losap, Murilo, and Nomwin in the area of Truk.

She arrived at Whampoa anchorage on 17 September. From there she sailed to "Capshee Bay", which she reached on 12 October, before she returned to Whampoa on 21 November. From there she sailed to St Helena, which she reached on 17 April, and then on to Long Reach, arriving back in Britain on 14 June.

The LR for 1803 showed her master as changing from Sterling to Robinson. It reported that she had damages repaired in 1802, and that her trade was London–Botany Bay.

On her second voyage she was under the command of John Robinson. The Napoleonic Wars had commenced so Robinson applied for and received a letter of marque on 16 September 1803. Coromandel sailed from England on 4 December 1803, with 200 male convicts, and 32 officers and men of the New South Wales Corps, who provided the guards. While sailing in the Bay of Biscay Experiment suffered damage during a gale and had to limp back to Cowes for repairs. Robinson died off St. Salvador, and George Blakely took over command. Coromandel arrived at Port Jackson on 7 May 1804. No convicts died during the voyage.

Coromandel left Port Jackson on 10 July bound for China.

French capture
The French privateer  captured Coromandel on 15 March 1805 as she was sailing from China to London, and sent her into Mauritius. The EIC put the value of the cargo lost when the French captured her at £35,768.

By 1809 Coromandel was back in British hands with William Linton, master, and W. Gordon, owner. The question of how she returned to British control and ownership is currently obscure.

For the invasions of Île Bourbon and Île de France (Mauritius) in 1810-1811 the British government hired a number of transport vessels. Coromandel was among them.

Coromandel, Hogue, Davidson, & Co., owners, appeared on a list of vessels registered at Calcutta in January 1811.

Misadventures
There was a Coromandel that was reported to have been totally lost in the Carimata Passage, together with Abercrombie, the first coming from Bengal bound for Batavia and the second from Bombay to China. Apparently Coromandel was badly stranded in the Karimata Passage in 1812, but salved and repaired.

American capture
The next notable event occurred on 2 August 1814. The American privateer schooner York (or Yorktown), captured Coromandel, a "country ship" of 500 tons (bm), as she was sailing from Batavia to London. Lloyd's List reported that Coromandel, Cameron, master, from St Helena, was missing from "the Fleet" on 13 August.  recaptured Coromandel on the 12th. Coromandel arrived at Plymouth on 16 August 1814.

Ongoing service
On 12 January 1816 Coromandel stopped at the Cape on her way to Madras and Bengal; she was still under Cameron's command.

What connects this Coromandel with that of the voyages to Australia is that a Coromandel appeared in the Lloyd's Register (LR) for 1818 and 1819. LR described her as a teak-built vessel of 503 tons (bm), launched in 1793 in the East Indies. Her master was "A. Cameron", her owner was "Campbell", and her trade was London to India.

Fate
Coromandel foundered on 6 February 1821. Coromandel, W. Butler, master, was sailing for Malacca when her crew had to abandon her off the coast of Borneo as she was in a sinking state. The crew took to three boats and all were saved. Butler and 39 officers and men arrived at "Kemanlie", the second boat with an officer and 12 men arrived at Sourabaya, and the third boat arrived at Samarang.

Notes, citations, and references
Notes

Citations

References
 
 
 
 
Reports and Papers on the Impolicy of Employing Indian Built Ships in the Trade of the East-India Company, and of Admitting Them to British Registry: With Observation on Its Injurious Consequences to the Landed and Shipping Interests, and to the Numerous Branches of Trade Dependent on the Building and Equipment of British-built Ships. (1809). (London:Blacks and Parry).

1790s ships
Convict ships to New South Wales
Ships of the British East India Company
Age of Sail merchant ships
Merchant ships of the United Kingdom
Captured ships
Maritime incidents in February 1821